Al Dar Islands is a group of resort islands near Sitra, in the archipelago of Bahrain.

Al Dar Island Resort is a ten-minute offshore trip from the dhow harbour Sitra fisherman's port (Bandar Al Dar). The resort offers jetskiing, snorkeling and other water sports.

It provides boat transportation accommodating guest to and from the island with a maximum of 10 minutes one-way drive from Sitra fisherman port to the island. 

There are varieties of hut accommodation areas with BBQs. The huts are built with palm leaves, carpeted and equipped with electric fan and socket inside.

Demography
The islands are uninhabited.

Administration
The island belongs to Southern Governorate.

Transportation

Al Dar Island accommodates guests from Sitra Fishermans port to the island every 15 to 30 minutes during the operational time. It provides 11 seater and 18 seater speed boats with all necessary safety equipment to ensure all guest are safe while travelling to the island.

Tourism
Al Dar Island Resort is a ten-minute offshore trip from the dhow harbour Sitra fisherman's port. The team at Al Dar Island Resort is dedicated to the belief that each of us should spend quality time together and there's no better place to do that than on a day out with your family and friends. A short vacation at the resorts provides the perfect opportunity to strengthen your bonds with loved ones while relaxing in a peaceful surrounding at one of the finest destinations in Bahrain.

Offering one of the cleanest land and sea, of all Bahrain natural beaches this beach resort is one that offers a blend of exciting adventure activities, as well as sightseeing opportunities, Jetski, Snorkeling, Scuba Diving and many more water sports.

It provides boat transportation accommodating guest to and from the island with a maximum of 10 minutes one-way drive from Sitra fisherman port to the island. 

It also offers six wonderful beach chalets facing the beach that is set in the far north end of the island and benefited from being completely separated from the vibrant southern end of the resort. The chalets at the resort offer exquisitely adorned living spaces with air-conditioned fully furnished interior, private outdoor balcony and a small attached outside kitchen.

An island getaway is not completed without a BBQ on the beach. The island welcomes your own BBQ or a small picnic up close to the beach. There are varieties of hut accommodation areas that you can choose on the island while enjoying the aroma of your own BBQ. The huts are built with palm leaves, carpeted and equipped with electric fan and socket inside.

And the large tent can hold 80 people seated or 130 standing and is great for parties, corporate, weddings or other events. This versatile space is equipped with a/c units and if needed banqueting tables, chairs, buffet and lighting can be supplied.

Whether you are going to have lunch, dinner or just a drink after a busy day, our island restaurant and bar will always meet your needs. Our restaurant offers an ala cart menu including a variety of seasonal offerings whether it is spicy rice and curry, western cuisine, fast food or a simple salad, we are ready with an array of mouth-watering fresh dishes to entice your taste buds.   

A cup of coffee or another drink of your choice in our bar in front of the beach indoors or outdoors offers the perfect ambience to satisfy your gastronomical whims during your stay at the resort.

Image gallery

References 

Islands of Bahrain
Sitra